Senator Shealy may refer to:

Katrina Shealy (born 1954), South Carolina State Senate
Ryan Shealy (politician) (1923–2001), South Carolina State Senate